Robert Lang is a Canadian film producer, director, writer. His career began in Montreal in the early 70s working on independent productions and at the National Film Board of Canada as a documentary film director and cinematographer. In 1980, he moved to Toronto, where he founded his own independent production company, Kensington Communications, to produce documentaries for television and non-theatrical markets. Since 1998, Lang has been involved in conceiving and producing interactive media for the Web and mobile devices.

Career
Robert Lang's work in television includes a number of documentary and factual series: Museum Secrets, a 22-part television series that investigates the stories behind artifacts in great museums around the world for History, UKTV and BBC Worldwide; Shameless Idealists, a five-part series that profiles a number of prominent change-makers and social activists for CTV; Diamond Road, a three-part series about the diamond industry for TVO, ZDF Arte and Discovery Times; The Sacred Balance, a four-part miniseries for CBC and PBS based on the book by geneticist and environmentalist Dr. David Suzuki; 72 Hours: True Crime, a true crime factual series for CBC and TLC; and Exhibit A: Secrets of Forensic Science, a forensic crime series hosted by Graham Greene for Discovery and TLC.

Most recently, Lang's productions include: two one-hour science documentaries, Why We Dance and Nature's Cleanup Crew, for CBC Television's The Nature of Things and Arte; The Shadow of Gold for TVO, Arte France and SVT, co-produced with Films å Çinq and CAPA in Paris, a feature documentary examination of the global gold industry from raw material to market; and between 2015 and 2017, Lang produced two one-hour documentaries, Champions vs Legends and The Equalizer, produced by Kensington Communications in co-production with Berlin Producers for broadcast on CBC’s The Nature of Things, SRC Explora and ZDF/Arte. in 2017, he was director/writer/producer of a point-of-view 1-hour documentary for TVOntario and Canal D, called Risk Factor. In 2015, Lang produced a one-hour documentary for TVOntario and CPAC called The Drop: Why Young People Don't Vote.

Before that he was responsible for several documentary films, including: as producer, co-writer of Raw Opium, which examines the failure of the War on Drugs through the lives of people involved in the international opium trade (TVO, ZDF Arte, SBS); as director/writer/producer of Return to Nepal, in which musician Bruce Cockburn travels to the remote Humla district of Northwestern Nepal (CBC documentary); as co-writer/co-director/co-producer of Almost Home: a Sayisi Dene Journey, an intimate portrait of a Canadian aboriginal community in transition for CBC Nature of Things and APTN; as director/producer of River of Sand, which explores the ancient culture, popular music, and current struggles of the people of Mali, West Africa for Vision TV and TVO; as producer/co-director of Separate Lives, the Gemini-winning documentary which follows the lives of conjoined twins from Pakistan and the pioneering operation that gave them a chance at a new life for Discovery; as director/co-producer of The Biggest Little Ticket, a children’s musical fantasy special for CTV which won several awards and Mariposa: Under a Stormy Sky, a documentary music special for CTV.

He has produced many interactive digital projects over the years, from River of Sand interactive website (1998), to The Sacred Balance online (2003), Diamond Road interactive documentary (2007), Museum Secrets Interactive (2011), ScopifyROM, a mobile app to enhance the museum experience at the Royal Ontario Museum (2013) and Risk Navigator mobile app (2017).

Lang was recipient of the Queen Elizabeth II Golden Jubilee Medal in 2002, was named North American Trailblazer of the Year by MIPDOC in 2009 and his work in film and television has garnered many national and international awards (see Awards section below for details). He's also been active in the production community as a founding member of the Documentary Organization of Canada, as a board member for The Real News since 2007 and as the founder of the Hot Docs CrossCurrents Fund in 2013.

Filmography

TV Series credits

Select documentary credits

Accolades
 2016 Platinum Remi Award - The Equalizer, Houston International Film Festival, Sports Documentary
 2016 Finalist, Sports Documentary, The Equalizer, International Sport Film Festival Palermo
 2016 Nominated, Best Sports Program, Canadian Screen Awards, 2016
 2014 Canadian Screen Award - Museum Secrets (ACCT) Best Factual Series, Best Editing in an Information Program or Series
 2013 Canadian Screen Award - Museum Secrets (ACCT)
 2008 Canadian New Media Awards, Best News Information, Diamond Road Online (CNMA)
 2008 Gemini Award – Best Documentary Series, Diamond Road (ACCT) 
 2008 Platinum Award – Best Feature Documentary, Diamond Road (Houston Worldfest) 
 2007 Worldmedal – Docudrama, 72 Hours:True Crime (New York Festivals)  
 2005 Worldmedal – Docudrama, 72 Hours:True Crime (New York Festivals)
 2004 Golden Sheaf Award – Best Documentary, Social/Political Almost Home (Yorkton Festival) 
 2004 NFB Kathleen Shannon Award, Almost Home (Yorkton Short Film & Video Festival) 
 2004 Platinum Award – Ecology/Environment/Conservation, Sacred Balance Show 3 Fire of Creation (Houston Worldfest)
 2003 Prix Science & Societé, Sacred Balance Show 2: The Matrix of Life (Paris Festival International de l’Emission Scientifique de Télévision) 
 1998 Prix Regard Canadien, River of Sand  (Vues D’Afrique)
 1998 Gemini Award – Science, Technology, Nature, Separate Lives (ACCT) 
 1997 Hot Docs – Vision TV Humanitarian Award, A Place in the World
 1995 Award of Excellence – Best Variety, The Biggest Little Ticket (Alliance for Children and Television) 
 1994 Blé D’Or Award, Fragile Harvest (Agrovidéo, Montreal)
 1990 Gold Award, Seeds (Berlin Agricultural Film Festival)

References

External links
 
 Kensington Communications

Living people
Canadian film production company founders
Canadian television producers
Canadian documentary film producers
Year of birth missing (living people)

cs:Robert Lang
fr:Robert Lang